Marina Mora Montero (born c. 1980) is a model who, as Miss La Libertad, was elected Miss Peru 2002 and  represented Peru at Miss World 2002 where she finished third.

In 2016, she was guest judge in the final Miss Peru 2016 beauty pageant, celebrated in the Ecological Center and Studios of America Television Production, Pachacamac, Lima, Peru.

Personal life
In 2005, Mora married her first cousin, Gustavo Mora. They later separated.

See also
Miss La Libertad

References

1980s births
Living people
Peruvian female models
Miss World 2002 delegates
Peruvian beauty pageant winners
Peruvian child models